Al Fajr Arabsalim Sporting Club is a football club based in Arabsalim, Nabatieh, Lebanon.

They won the 2010–11 Lebanese Third Division with no losses in 21 consecutive games and were promoted to the Lebanese Second Division for the first time ever in their history.

Honours 
 Lebanese Third Division
 Champions (1): 2010–11

References

Football clubs in Lebanon